Kelottijärvi  is a village and lake in the municipality of Enontekiö in Lapland in north-western Finland.

Villages in Finland
Landforms of Lapland (Finland)
Geography of Lapland (Finland)
Lakes of Norrbotten County
Lakes of Enontekiö